Matteo Valli (born 11 September 1986) is a Sanmarinese football striker.

Valli briefly played professionally for San Marino Calcio in Serie C2.

He scored for U-21 side against Lithuania U21, Bosnia-Herzegovina U-21, Spain U-21 and  Armenia U-21.

He was not yet call up to qualifying round of 2009 edition

In 2010 FIFA World Cup qualification (UEFA), he appeared as unused against Northern Ireland and Czech Republic.

As in 2010 has won back all matches in a cup of Regions, for the basic national team and even could score one goal.

He was part of Tre Penne's squad to win San Marino's first game on international club level during the first qualifying round in the 2013–14 UEFA Champions League campaign, beating Shirak F.C. of Armenia 1–0.

References

External links

1986 births
Living people
Sammarinese footballers
A.C. Cesena players
Expatriate footballers in Italy
Association football forwards
A.S.D. Victor San Marino players
S.P. Tre Penne players